Olive is a dark yellowish-green color, like that of unripe or green olives.

As a color word in the English language, it appears in late Middle English.

Variations

Olivine 

Olivine is the typical color of the mineral olivine.

The first recorded use of olivine as a color name in English was in 1912.

Olive drab  

Olive drab is variously described as a "dull olive-green colour" (Oxford English Dictionary); "a shade of greenish-brown" (Webster's New World Dictionary); "a dark gray-green" (MacMillan English dictionary); "a grayish olive to dark olive brown or olive gray" (American Heritage Dictionary); or "A dull but fairly strong gray-green color" (Collins English Dictionary). It is widely used as a camouflage color for uniforms and equipment in the armed forces.

The first recorded use of olive drab as a color name in English was in 1892. Drab is an older color name, from the middle of the 16th century. It refers to a dull light brown color, the color of cloth made from undyed homespun wool. It took its name from the old French word for cloth, drap.

There are many shades and variations of olive drab. Various shades were used on United States Army uniforms in World War II. The shade used for enlisted soldier's uniforms at the beginning of the war was officially called Olive Drab #33 (OD33), while officer's uniforms used the much darker Olive Drab #51 (OD51). Field equipment was in Olive Drab #3 (OD3), a very light, almost khaki shade. In 1943 new field uniforms and equipment were produced in the darker Olive Drab #7 (OD7). This was in turn replaced by the slightly grayer Olive Green 107 (OG-107) in 1952, which continued as the color of combat uniforms through the Vietnam War until the adoption in 1981 of the four-color-camouflage-patterned M81 Battle Dress Uniform, which retained olive drab as one of the color swatches in the pattern. The shade used for painting vehicles is defined by Federal Standard 595 in the United States.

As a solid color, it is not as effective for camouflage as multi-color patterns, though it is still used by the U.S. military to color webbing and accessories. The armies of Israel, India, Cuba, and Venezuela wear solid-color olive drab uniforms.

In the American novel A Separate Peace, Finny says to Gene, "...and in these times of war, we all see olive drab, and we all know it is the patriotic color. All others aren't about the war; they aren't patriotic."

Pantone 448 C, "the ugliest color in the world" commonly used in plain tobacco packaging, was initially described as a shade of olive green.

Black olive 

Black olive is a color in the RAL color matching system. It is designated as RAL 6015.

The color "black olive" is a representation of the color of black olives.

Olive in culture 
Ethnography
 The term "olive-skinned" is sometimes used to denote shades of medium-toned skin that is darker than the average color for White people, especially in connection with a Mediterranean ethnicity.

See also 
 List of colors
 Khaki, another color common in military uniforms

References 

Quaternary colors
Shades of green
Shades of black
Web colors